Out Here is a studio album by American jazz bassist Christian McBride. It was released on  via Mack Avenue label. This is his twelfth album as a leader.

Reception

Critical reviews were generally favorable, as the album received a score of 79% on Metacritic. Matt Collar of AllMusic wrote "Christian McBride's second studio album in 2013, Out Here, finds the adept bassist leading his trio through a jaunty, exuberant set of straight-ahead acoustic jazz. The album follows on the heels of his equally as appealing quintet album, People Music. However, where that album found McBride delving into the knotty post-bop sound of artists like '60s Bobby Hutcherson, Out Here is more of a classic standards album in the vein of works by Oscar Peterson and Duke Ellington. Joining McBride here is his working trio of pianist Christian Sands and drummer Ulysses Owens, Jr., who was also featured on People Music. Both Sands and Owens are superb, technically adroit musicians who complement McBride's warm, generous bass playing at every turn on Out Here. What's great about McBride leading his own trio is that because he is fundamentally such a monster of a bassist, he can and does take the lead on any given song just as well, if not better, than many of his non-rhythm section instrument-playing brethren."

Phil Johnson of The Independent stated "Most piano trios in what is now a very crowded market, follow some special programme or USP: getting all trancey, say, or covering tunes by long dead folkies. McBride, who is both the bassist and the boss, doesn't bother, preferring the usual mix of standards and ballads. The result is refreshing but also a bit boring, although things get interesting towards the end with a gooey show-tune ("I Have Dreamed") and a funky "Who's Making Love".

Track listing

Personnel
Band
Christian McBride – bass, producer
Christian Sands – piano
Ulysses Owens – drums

Production
Randall Kennedy – creative director
André Kimo Stone Guess – associate producer
Chi Modu – photography
Raj Naik – art direction, design
Al Pryor – A&R
Will Wakefield – production manager
Mark Wilder – mastering

Chart performance

References

External links
 Christian McBride Discography

2013 albums
Christian McBride albums
Mack Avenue Records albums